Minister for Planning is a position in the government of Western Australia, currently held by Rita Saffioti of the Labor Party. The position was first created after the 1953 state election, for the government of Albert Hawke, and has existed in every government since then. The minister is responsible for the state government's Department of Planning, Lands & Heritage, and takes advice and recommendations from the Western Australian Planning Commission.

Titles
 23 February 1953 – 3 March 1971: Minister for Town Planning
 3 March 1971 – 12 October 1971: Minister for Decentralisation and Town Planning
 12 October 1971 – 8 April 1974: Minister for Town Planning
 8 April 1974 – 25 February 1983: Minister for Urban Development and Town Planning
 25 February 1983 – 16 February 2001: Minister for Planning
 16 February 2001 – 23 September 2008: Minister for Planning and Infrastructure
 23 September 2008 – present: Minister for Planning

List of ministers

See also
 Minister for Heritage (Western Australia)
 Minister for Housing (Western Australia)
 Minister for Lands (Western Australia)
 Minister for State Development (Western Australia)
 Minister for Transport (Western Australia)

References
 David Black (2014), The Western Australian Parliamentary Handbook (Twenty-Third Edition). Perth [W.A.]: Parliament of Western Australia.

Planning
Minister for Planning